Libertære Socialister (abbreviated to LS) was a Danish political left-wing organization which was founded on November 8, 2009, at its third initial meeting in Horsens. The organisation was working on the political ground of an anti-capitalist, revolutionary and libertarian socialist platform. LS had local groups in Copenhagen, Aalborg and Odense and these groups were linked together in a federation, which was described in details the organization's rules.

LS was described as "the most important and most visible representative of the anarchist trend in Denmark". LS describe themselves on their website as "a federation of independent local groups that seek to promote the fight for libertarian socialism: a stateless socialist council society based on federalism and direct democracy.". LS was an anti-parliamentarist organization and rejected any participation in elections. Instead LS advocates and uses the direct-action-methods of mass anarchism and syndicalism: strikes, blockades, occupations, sabotage, work-to-rule, boycotts, slowdown, demonstrations, etc. LS consider the revolutionary general strike and the popular insurrection as the ultimate weapons that can end capitalism and statism and bring about a libertarian socialist society.

In 2017, after a period of in-activity, LS was dissolved.

Activities
The local LS-groups arranged lectures and discussion meetings and get involved in political struggles and movements relating to environment and climate, industrial and social conflicts, anti-racism, anti-militarism, gender politics etc. The organisation had in several cases defended the use of political militancy under certain circumstances. During the protests at the UN Climate Change Conference (COP15) in 2009, 913 were arrested in a mass arrest and as part of this maneuver all involved in the LS block in the demonstration were arrested. Many of those arrested sued the police for wrongful arrest and at the end of the case the arrests were found to be illegal, and the police were ordered to pay damages. At the labor movements May Day meetings in 2013 LS participated in protests against the Social Democrats and the Socialist People's Party and the policy they have led after the change of government in 2011 (In Copenhagen LS played a leading role in these protests). During the protests there were claims by both sides of aggressive behaviour from the other side, some of which were later retracted. The protests had the effect that speakers from the Social Democrats and SF had to interrupt their speeches ahead of time at the meetings in Copenhagen, Aalborg, Aarhus and other cities.

Direkte Aktion
LS published the magazine Direkte Aktion, which began to be published in February 2011.

International relations
Internationally, LS joined the Anarkismo-network and is helping to edit the website Anarkismo.net and the Anarchist Black Cat forums. LS participates in international conferences of the Anarkismo-network and is working together with other affiliated organizations on joint campaigns. The Anarkismo-network's European branch has created EuroAnarkismo with the aim of strengthening the international cooperation and the anarchist movement in Europe. By joining the Anarkismo-network LS has placed itself within the platformist-especifist tradition of the international anarchist movement.

See also 
 Anarchism
 Anarchist communism
 Platformism
 Especifismo
 Anarkismo.net
 Libertarian socialism
 Anarcho-syndicalism
 Social anarchism
 Workers' self-management
 Social insertion
 Black Flame
 Dielo Truda
 Friends of Durruti Group
 Makhnovism

References

External links
 Official website
 The magazine Direkte Aktion
 Anarkismo.net
 EuroAnarkismo
 An Archive of Writings on the Platformist Tradition within Anarchism

Anarchist Federations
Defunct platformist organizations
Libertarian socialist organizations
Anarchist organizations in Denmark
Organizations established in 2009
Organizations disestablished in 2017
2009 establishments in Denmark
2017 disestablishments in Denmark